The Donald and Ruth McGraw House, located in the Dunthorpe neighborhood of Multnomah County, Oregon, just outside the Portland municipal boundary, is listed on the National Register of Historic Places. It was the home of the late Donald and Ruth McGraw.

It was designed by architect Jamieson Parker.

See also
 National Register of Historic Places listings in Multnomah County, Oregon

References

1932 establishments in Oregon
Colonial Revival architecture in Oregon
Houses completed in 1932
Houses in Multnomah County, Oregon
Houses on the National Register of Historic Places in Oregon
National Register of Historic Places in Multnomah County, Oregon
Portland Historic Landmarks